The Digi-Comp I was a functioning, mechanical digital computer sold in kit form. It was originally manufactured from polystyrene parts by E.S.R., Inc. starting in 1963 and sold as an educational toy for US$4.99.

A successor, the Digi-Comp II, was not programmable, but in effect a visible calculator. A two-level masonite platform with guides served as the medium for a supply of marbles that rolled down an inclined plane, moving plastic cams as they fell.

Operation
In essence, the Digi-Comp I contained three mechanical flip-flops, providing an ability to connect them together in a programmable way using thin vertical wires that are either pushed, or blocked from moving, by a number of cylindrical pegs. The whole arrangement was 'clocked' by moving a lever back and forth. Different configurations of these cylinders caused the Digi-Comp to compute different boolean logic operations. With a three binary digit (3-bit) readout of the state of the flip-flops, it could be programmed to demonstrate binary logic, to perform various operations such as addition and subtraction, and to play some simple logic games such as Nim.

Reproductions

The Digi-Comp I version 2.0 has been made available by Minds-On Toys since 2005 as a relatively inexpensive binder's board version of the original Digi-Comp with a much enhanced instruction manual.

See also 
 Dr. Nim - game based on the computer
 Geniac
 WDR paper computer
 CARDboard Illustrative Aid to Computation
 Turing Tumble, a 2019 mechanical computer inspired by it
Robert C. Martin, who credits playing with this toy at the age of 12 as being what made him decide to become a programmer for the rest of his life.
 Little man computer

References

External links
 The Old Computer Museum - Collection of old analog, digital and mechanical computers
 Friends of Digi-Comp - Discussion of this toy. Images, links, manuals and programming information
 Digi-Comp I v2.0 - Online vendor of working replica kit; historical details
 Digi-Comp I Emulator - Emulator for the original Digi-Comp I written in JavaScript

Mechanical computers
Educational toys
Products introduced in 1963